Elections to Hammersmith and Fulham Council were held on 4 May 2006.  The whole council was up for election for the first time since the 2002 election.

Election result

|}

At the Hammersmith and Fulham council election, 2006, the Conservative Party won a majority for the first time since 1968, taking 33 seats and forming the Administration for the London Borough of Hammersmith and Fulham . The Council leader was Cllr Stephen Greenhalgh. Labour formed the opposition on the Council, with 13 seats, and was led by Stephen Cowan.

The Conservative Party came close to losing the usually safe ward of Palace Riverside, after the sitting councillors were deselected, and ran as independents. One of the two rebels returned 12 years later as the Conservative candidate in the same ward, and was elected.

One notable loss for the Labour Party was one of the three seats in the Shepherds Bush Green ward - which only ever elected Labour councillors before or since.  After alternating between Abu Khalad (1986, 1994 & 2002) and Jafar Khaled (1990 & 1998), Abu Khaled stood for re-election but lost by 4 votes in a ward where the Conservatives had previously been nowhere near winning a seat.

Ward results

The borough is divided into 16 electoral wards, all bar two electing three councillors apiece.

Addison

Askew

Avonmore & Brook Green

College Park & Old Oak

Fulham Broadway

Fulham Reach

Hammersmith Broadway

Munster

North End

Palace Riverside

Parson's Green & Walham

Ravenscourt Park

Sands End

Shepherd's Bush Green

Town

Wormholt & White City

References

2006
2006 London Borough council elections
21st century in the London Borough of Hammersmith and Fulham